Gaylord Regional Airport  is a county-owned, public-use airport located one nautical mile (2 km) southwest of the central business district of Gaylord, a city in Otsego County, Michigan, United States. It is included in the Federal Aviation Administration (FAA) National Plan of Integrated Airport Systems for 2017–2021, in which it is categorized as a local general aviation facility.

Facilities and aircraft 

For the 12-month period ending December 31, 2020, the airport had about 10,000 aircraft operations, or 27 per day. It was composed entirely of general aviation. For the same time period, there are 25 aircraft based on the field: 16 single-engine and 7 multi-engine airplanes, 1 jet, and 1 helicopter.

The airport is staffed seven days a week from 7:00 a.m. until 5:00 p.m. It is listed as a tier one airport in all categories of the Michigan Airport System Plan. The airport is accessible by road from Van Tyle Road, and is close to M-32 and Interstate 75.

The airport has one fixed base operator. It offers fuel, ground handling, refreshments, a conference room, a shower, snooze rooms, a lounge, office space, and more.

Accidents & Incidents
On October 24, 2000, a Piper PA-28 impacted trees and terrain while flying the Instrument Landing System approach to the airport. The cause of the accident was found to be the pilot's failure to maintain proper glideslope and localizer alignment during a precision approach, the pilot's decision to continue the flight below decision height without executing a missed approach, and the pilot's failure to maintain altitude clearance.

References

External links 
 Gaylord Regional Airport, official site
   at Michigan DOT Airport Directory
 Aerial image as of April 1998 from USGS The National Map
 

Gaylord, Michigan
Airports in Michigan
Buildings and structures in Otsego County, Michigan
Transportation in Otsego County, Michigan